Pseudanthias evansi, also called the yellowback anthias, is a salt water fish. It is a tropical fish found in the Indian Ocean. It is sometimes used as an aquarium fish.

References

External links
 

evansi
Fish of Thailand
Taxa named by J. L. B. Smith
Fish described in 1954